Jamal is an Arabic male given name.

Jamal may also refer to:
Jamal (wrestler) (1973–2009), Samoan professional wrestler
Jamal (band), Polish reggae raggamuffin and hip-hop duo from Radom
Jamal (rapper), American rapper and music producer
Jamaican Movement for the Advancement of Literacy
Tatra T 163 Jamal, heavy duty truck
 Feast of Jamál ("Beauty"), the first day of the third month in the calendar of the Baháʼí Faith

See also

Jamali (disambiguation)